Haginari Dam is a gravity dam located in Akita Prefecture in Japan. The dam is used for flood control and power production. The catchment area of the dam is 86.7 km2. The dam impounds about 85  ha of land when full and can store 14950 thousand cubic meters of water. The construction of the dam was started on 1961 and completed in 1966.

References

Dams in Akita Prefecture
1966 establishments in Japan